Corinna Lechner (born 10 August 1994) is a German racing cyclist, who currently rides for Dutch amateur team MEXX–Watersley International. She rode at the 2014 UCI Road World Championships.

Major results
2021
 2nd  Mixed team relay, European Road Championships

References

External links
 

1994 births
Living people
German female cyclists
Cyclists from Bavaria
People from Fürstenfeldbruck (district)
Sportspeople from Upper Bavaria